The following are the national records in athletics in Denmark maintained by Denmark's national athletics federation: Dansk Atletik Forbund (DAF).

Outdoor

Key to tables:

+ = en route to a longer distance

h = hand timing

Mx = mixed race

Men

Women

Indoor

Men

Women

References
General
Danish Outdoor Records – Men
Danish Outdoor Records – Women 29 June 2019 updated
Danish Indoor Records – Men
Danish Indoor Records – Women 2 March 2019 updated
Specific

External links
DAF web site

Danish
Athletics
Records
Athletics